Berwyn is a census-designated place (CDP) in Chester County, Pennsylvania. Berwyn is located within Tredyffrin and Easttown Townships.  The area is part of the Philadelphia Main Line suburbs.

History
At times, the village has been called Cocheltown, Reeseville, Glassley, and Gaysville. The town received its present name in 1877 during the celebration of its centennial when one of the Welsh settlers proposed to name the village after the Berwyn Hills overlooking the Valley of the Dee River in Denbighshire, Wales.

Geography

Demographics

The population of zip code 19312 (which contains the entirety of Berwyn in addition to a small area in Willistown and Newtown townships) was 11,745 at the 2020 census. 

According to the 2021 American Community Survey's five-year population estimates, Berwyn was 82% non-Hispanic White, 1% Black or African American, 0% Native American and 14% Asian. 3% of residents reported two or more races and 3% of the population were of Hispanic or Latino ancestry. 16.7% of residents were foreign-born, of whom 57% were born in Asia, 35% were born in Europe and 5% were born in Latin America. 4.8% of residents are U.S. veterans.

There were 11,745 people and 4,318 households residing in the township. The population density was 1,228 people per square mile. 88% of units were single-family homes and 81% of households were headed by a married couple. 

The median income for a household was $174,583, with 46% of households earning more than $200,000 per year. The per capita income was $88,056, 2.4 times higher than the per capita income of Pennsylvania. Ranked by mean household income, Berwyn's zip code, 19312, is 7th among 1,798 zip codes in Pennsylvania. 

78% of residents over the age of 25 hold a bachelor's degree and 39% have earned a graduate degree.

The median value of owner-occupied housing units was $711,600, 3.6 times higher than the median value in the state of Pennsylvania.

Culture
Berwyn is home of the Footlighters' Theater, a non-profit theater that has provided entertainment for over 80 years. Footlighters' Theater is the oldest community theater on the Philadelphia Main Line.

Points of interest include the Easttown Public Library, the Upper Main Line YMCA, Teegarden Park and Glen Brook Farm.  

The Easttown Public Library was founded in 1905 and is a member of the Chester County Library System which consists of the 18 public libraries in the county.  The Upper Main Line YMCA was founded in 1962 and sits on the former 124-acre summer estate owned by investment banker J. Gardner Cassatt, the brother of famed painter Mary Cassatt and railroad magnate Alexander Cassatt.

Economy
Ametek, Hardinge, Inc., Trinseo, Triumph Group, and TE Connectivity have their operational headquarters in Berwyn.

Education

The public school system is Tredyffrin/Easttown School District, the second highest-rated school district in Pennsylvania, according to Niche.com's 2023 rankings. Schools serving portions of the Berwyn CDP are Beaumont and Devon elementary schools in Easttown Township and Hillside Elementary School in Tredyffrin Township.

The district operates two middle schools, Tredyffrin/Easttown and Valley Forge, both in Tredyffrin Township. Conestoga High School, located in Tredyffrin, near the Berwyn CDP, serves the CDP; as does Tredyffrin-Easttown Middle School.

The Roman Catholic Archdiocese of Philadelphia operates area Catholic parish schools. In 2012 the Catholic grade school St. Monica closed.

Parks
Frank Johnson Memorial Park, in the Berwyn CDP, is operated by the township government. It has a pavilion with toilets, basketball courts, an open field, a "tot lot", and volleyball courts.

Also, Crabby Creek Park, in Berwyn, is operated by the township government. It is a 48 acre park, located off Walnut Lane at Bodine Road in Berwyn, which serves as passive open space and a stream corridor buffer for Crabby Creek

Notable people

Harold Barron, Olympic sprinter silver medallist
Jake Cohen, American-Israeli professional basketball player for Maccabi Tel Aviv and the Israeli national basketball team
David Eisenhower and Julie Nixon Eisenhower
Rachelle Ferrell, six-octave range recording artist
Brad Ingelsby, screenwriter and film producer
 Drew O'Keefe, U.S. Attorney for the Eastern District of Pennsylvania

References

External links

Philadelphia Main Line
Census-designated places in Chester County, Pennsylvania
Census-designated places in Pennsylvania
1777 establishments in Pennsylvania